Maksim Yuryevich Astafyev (born 8 December 1982) is a Russian football coach and a former player. He is an assistant coach for FC Leningradets Leningrad Oblast.

Career
He made his debut in the Russian Premier League in 2001 for FC Zenit St. Petersburg. In February 2010 FC Sibir Novosibirsk signed the versatile midfielder from FC Rostov on a two-year deal. Since December 2014, he played for FC Tosno in Russian National Football League.

References

External links
  Profile on the FC Rostov site

1982 births
People from Kolpino
Living people
Russian footballers
Russia youth international footballers
Association football midfielders
FC Zenit Saint Petersburg players
FC Luch Vladivostok players
FC Rostov players
FC Sibir Novosibirsk players
Russian Premier League players
FC Ural Yekaterinburg players
FC Tom Tomsk players
FC Tosno players
FC Mordovia Saransk players
FC SKA-Khabarovsk players
FC Leningradets Leningrad Oblast players
FC Zenit-2 Saint Petersburg players